Derek W. H. Thomas is a Reformed pastor and theologian known for his teaching, writing and editorial work.  He is currently the senior pastor of First Presbyterian Church of Columbia, South Carolina and distinguished visiting professor of systematic and historical theology at Reformed Theological Seminary in Atlanta, Georgia.

Career
Thomas is originally from Wales.  In 1978,  he completed his ministerial training from Reformed Theological Seminary in the US before moving on to receive his PhD from the University of Wales, Lampeter with a thesis on Calvin's preaching on the Book of Job. He served as a pastor for 17 years in Belfast, Northern Ireland before returning to the United States in 1996 to serve as the minister of teaching at First Presbyterian Church in Jackson.  In 2011, he became associate pastor at First Presbyterian Church in Columbia, South Carolina. He was appointed the senior pastor of First Presbyterian Church, Columbia, South Carolina on August 11, 2013. He has written and edited 15 books, and has also produced a volume for the Biblical commentary series published by Banner of Truth Trust and Evangelical Press. In 2004, Derek Thomas became editorial director for The Alliance of Confessing Evangelicals and the editor of its e-zine, Reformation 21.

Plagiarism 
In 2018  P&R Publishing withdrew Derek Thomas' commentary on the book of Acts after allegations of uncredited use of pastor Sinclair Ferguson's work.  They noted that  "the lack of attribution resulted from unclear note-taking more than a decade before the commentary on Acts was written, and we believe it does not reflect intentional misuse on the part of the author."

The church leadership at Thomas' church backed Thomas in a statement of support. Reformed Theological Seminary, which Thomas works for as a professor, also defended him, saying, "an RTS committee reviewing the Acts incident had cleared Thomas of 'any knowing and intentional plagiarism.' He [Ligon Duncan] added that Thomas will continue to teach.  'From the standpoint of RTS,' Duncan wrote, 'the case is now closed.'"

A commission of the Associate Reformed Presbyterian Catawba Presbytery found that Derek Thomas did in fact plagiarize the sermons of Sinclair Ferguson, but that 
"none of the interviews and investigations of this Committee have revealed any credible evidence that Derek Thomas intentionally engaged in the practice of plagiarism."  Accordingly, Thomas was admonished in writing by Catawba Presbytery for unintentional plagiarism.

Works
"Heaven On Earth:What the Bible Teaches about the Life to Come," Christian Focus, 2018
 Strength For The Weary, Reformation Trust Publishing, 2018
 The Pilgrim’s Progress: A Guided Tour, Ligonier Ministries, 2014
 How the Gospel Brings Us All the Way Home, Reformation Trust Publishing, 2011
 Acts: Reformed Expository Commentary 2011 (withdrawn by the publisher in November 2018 due to "unattributed content from sermons by another pastor")
 What Is Providence? (Basics of the Faith) P & R, 2008 
 Let’s Study Galatians Banner of Truth, 2004
 Calvin’s Teaching on Job: Proclaiming the Incomprehensible God  Christian Focus Publications, 2004.
 Give Praise to God: A Vision for Reforming Worship (Ed. With J. Ligon Duncan III and Philip Graham Ryken) P & R, 2003
 Let’s Study Revelation Edinburgh: Banner of Truth, 2003
 Mining for Wisdom: 28 Daily Readings from Job Evangelical Press, 2002.
 Making the Most of your Devotional Life Evangelical Press, 2001
 Praying the Saviour’s Way Christian Focus, 2001
 God Delivers: Isaiah Simply Explained, Welwyn Commentary Series, Evangelical Press, 1991, second impression 1998. Second Impression 1998.
 The Essential Commentaries for a Preacher’s Library, Reformed Academic Press, 1996.
 Taken Up To Heaven: The Ascension of Christ, with a foreword by J. Ligon Duncan, Evangelical Press, 1996.
 The Storm Breaks: Job Simply Explained, Welwyn Commentary Series, Evangelical Press, 1995. Second Impression 2004
 God Strengthens: Ezekiel Simply Explained, Welwyn Commentary Series, Evangelical Press, 1993. Second Impression 2003.
 Help for Hurting Christians: Reflections on Psalms, Evangelical Press, 1991.
 Wisdom: The Key to Living God’s Way, Christian Focus Publications, 1990.
 Serving  the King: A Guide to Christian Usefulness, Evangelical Press, 1989.

References

External links
Reformation 21
RTS biography of Derek Thomas
First Presbyterian Church - Columbia, SC

Welsh Calvinist and Reformed theologians
Living people
1953 births
American Calvinist and Reformed theologians
American Presbyterian ministers
20th-century Calvinist and Reformed theologians
21st-century Calvinist and Reformed theologians
Alumni of the University of Wales
Welsh emigrants to the United States
Bible commentators
Associate Reformed Presbyterian Church
People involved in plagiarism controversies